The Golden Age is the fourth studio album by British hardcore punk band Your Demise.

The first single from the album, Forget About Me, was released on 3 January 2012, with the album following on 26 March 2012.

Track listing

Personnel
The album features a number of guest vocalists, including Jason Butler of Letlive, Josh Franceschi of You Me at Six, Louis Gauthier of Breaking Point and Brutality Will Prevail, Ajay Jones formerly of Brutality Will Prevail, Theo Kindynis of Last Witness, Dannika Webber of Evarose and David Wood of Down to Nothing and Terror.

Your Demise
 Ed McRae – vocals
 Stuart Paice – guitar
 Daniel Osborne – guitar
 James Sampson – bass
 James Tailby – drums

Guest appearances
 Jason Butler of Letlive – guest vocals on track 7 ("I'm (Not) the One")
 Josh Franceschi of You Me at Six – guest vocals on track 10 ("A Decade Drifting")
 Louis Gauthier of Breaking Point and Brutality Will Prevail – guest vocals on track 11 ("Worthless")
 Ajay Jones formerly of Brutality Will Prevail – guest vocals on track 11 ("Worthless")
 Theo Kindynis of Last Witness – guest vocals on track 11 ("Worthless")
 Dannika Webber of Evarose – guest vocals on track 5 ("Paper Trails")
 David Wood of Down to Nothing and Terror – guest vocals on track 6 ("Forget About Me")
 Ben Phillips of Fastlane - all backing vocals/harmonies

References

Your Demise albums
2012 albums